A naggin in Ireland is a 200ml bottle of spirits. Major brands of vodka, whiskey, rum, and less often gin, are commonly sold in this size in off licences, especially independent (non-chain) shops, typically at 37.5% to 40% ABV. Naggins are more common than half-bottles (350ml - known as a "shoulder" or a "daddy naggin"), though for the less popular majority of products neither size is available, only the 700 mL EU standard bottle size . The naggin bottle is typically the shape of a large hip flask, suitable for placing in a pocket.

According to the Oxford English Dictionary, naggin is a variant of noggin, a word of uncertain origin recorded from the seventeenth century and meaning a small quantity of alcohol, usually one gill. Tomás S. Ó Máille derives it from the Irish naigín, cnaigín, a small wooden pail with a capacity of two glasses.

Naggins, particularly of cheap vodka, are very popular among youths, under-age drinkers and students. They are often implicated in binge drinking.

References

Irish units of measurement
Alcohol measurement
Bottles
Food and drink in Ireland